Jérôme Owono-Mimboe (4 February 1933 – 15 July 2016) was a Cameroonian Roman Catholic bishop.

Ordained to the priesthood on 22 July 1962, Owono-Mimboe was named bishop of the Roman Catholic Diocese of Obala, Cameroon on 3 July 1987 and retired 3 December 2009.

References 

1933 births
2016 deaths
20th-century Roman Catholic bishops in Cameroon
21st-century Roman Catholic bishops in Cameroon
Roman Catholic bishops of Obala